The 2013–14 Western Carolina Catamounts men's basketball team represented Western Carolina University during the 2013–14 NCAA Division I men's basketball season. The Catamounts, led by ninth year head coach Larry Hunter, played their home games at the Ramsey Center and were members of the Southern Conference. They finished the season 19–15, 10–6 in SoCon play to finish in fifth place. They advanced to the championship game of the SoCon tournament where they lost to Wofford.

Roster

Schedule

|-
!colspan=9 style="background:#592c87; color:#c0a878;"|  Regular season

|-
!colspan=9 style="background:#592c87; color:#c0a878;"| 2014 SoCon tournament

References

Western Carolina Catamounts men's basketball seasons
Western Carolina
West
West